The Northwest Amateur Radio Society (NARS) was established in 1985 and serves the suburban FM 1960 area in Northwest Houston, Texas under the vanity call sign W5NC, an extra-class license issued by the United States Federal Communications Commission (FCC).

NARS is active in community and public service events. The annually held Field Day event pits amateur radio operators to score highest points in number and types of two-way communications. The different modes of communication each have a designated point scoring schedule. Continuous Wave transception is used in Morse Code. Orbital satellite communications in the 2-meter and microwave bands have a higher scoring schedule than other modes. Information on transception modes are published as the amateur radio band plan.

There are several other amateur radio societies that exist surrounding the greater Houston area, including the Brazos Valley Amateur Radio Club (BVARC), the Houston ECHO Society., and the Katy Amateur Radio Society(KARS). In 2008, Bill Read, formerly with the Echo Society, was named as a director of the NOAA emergency weather bureau. The societies also act as volunteer exam coordinators (VEC) for amateur radio operator licensing with the American Radio Relay League (ARRL) corresponding from Houston to the FCC responsible for granting appropriate call signs to authorized radio stations.

References

External links
Northwest Amateur Radio Society website

Amateur radio organizations
Organizations based in Houston
Organizations established in 1985
1985 establishments in Texas